The Rayne Rice Birds were a minor league baseball team that existed from 1934 to 1941. In 1934, they were known as the Rayne Red Sox and from 1935 to 1941 known as the Rice Birds. They played in the Evangeline League and were affiliated with the Chicago White Sox and Brooklyn Dodgers.

A previous version of the Rice Birds played in the Louisiana State League in 1920.

See also
 :Category:Rayne Red Sox players
 :Category:Rayne Rice Birds players

References

Baseball Reference
A fictionalized look at the team

Evangeline Baseball League teams
Louisiana State Baseball League teams
Rayne, Louisiana
Defunct sports teams in Louisiana
Baseball teams established in 1934
Defunct minor league baseball teams
Brooklyn Dodgers minor league affiliates
Chicago White Sox minor league affiliates
Professional baseball teams in Louisiana
1934 establishments in Louisiana
Baseball teams disestablished in 1941
1941 disestablishments in Louisiana
Defunct baseball teams in Louisiana